Milan Pavličić  (born 20 December 1980) is a Croatian retired football forward.

Club career
Born in Osijek, SR Croatia, Pavličić played between 1999 and 2008 in the Croatian First League with NK Osijek and NK Varteks.

In summer 2008 he joined FC Fehérvár in the Hungarian NBI. In the following summer he returned to NK Osijek.

On 8 August 2012, he moved abroad again by signing a 2-year contract with newly promoted Serbian SuperLiga side FK Radnički Niš.

He then returned to Croatia and played for lower-league clubs sich as NK Grafičar Vodovod and also with Borac Kneževi Vinogradi, Tomislav Livana and Vihor Jelisavac, before moving to Germany and joining SV Hajduk Wiesbaden.

International career
He represented Croatia at U-20 level.

References

External links

 

1980 births
Living people
Sportspeople from Osijek
Association football forwards
Croatian footballers
Croatia youth international footballers
NK Osijek players
NK Varaždin players
Fehérvár FC players
FK Radnički Niš players
NK Grafičar Vodovod players
Croatian Football League players
Nemzeti Bajnokság I players
Serbian SuperLiga players
Croatian expatriate footballers
Expatriate footballers in Hungary
Croatian expatriate sportspeople in Hungary
Expatriate footballers in Serbia
Croatian expatriate sportspeople in Serbia
Expatriate footballers in Germany
Croatian expatriate sportspeople in Germany